The 2022–23 season is the 112th season in the history of Clermont Foot and their second consecutive season in the top flight. The club are participating in Ligue 1 and Coupe de France. The season covers the period from 1 July 2022 to 30 June 2023.

Players

Out on loan

Transfers

Pre-season and friendlies

Competitions

Overall record

Ligue 1

League table

Results summary

Results by round

Matches 
The league fixtures were announced on 17 June 2022.

Coupe de France

References 

Clermont Foot seasons
Clermont